On 20 November 1969, Nigeria Airways Flight 825, a Vickers VC10 aircraft, crashed while on approach to Lagos International Airport in Lagos, Nigeria killing all 87 people on board.

Flight
Nigeria Airways Flight 825 was en route from London to Lagos with intermediate stops in Rome and Kano. With its undercarriage down and its flaps partially extended, the VC-10 struck trees  short of runway 19 at Lagos. The aircraft crashed into the ground, an area of thick forest and exploded.

All 76 passengers and 11 crew on board were killed. Flight 825 was the first ever fatal crash involving the Vickers VC-10 as well as the deadliest accident or incident.

Cause
Immediately after the crash three automatic weapons were found in the wreckage. To counter a rumour that a fight between a prisoner and two guards caused the crash, a ballistics expert 
was consulted. It was learned none of the weapons had been recently fired.

The cause of the crash could never be determined with certainty, the flight recorder was not working at the time of the crash, but that it was most probably due to the flight crew being unaware of the aircraft's actual altitude during the final approach and allowing the aircraft to come below safe height when not in visual contact with the ground. Fatigue may have also been a contributing factor.

See also

List of accidents and incidents involving airliners by airline

References

Aviation accidents and incidents in Nigeria
Aviation accidents and incidents in 1969
Accidents and incidents involving the Vickers VC10
Airliner accidents and incidents involving controlled flight into terrain
Nigeria Airways accidents and incidents
1969 in Nigeria
November 1969 events in Africa
Airliner accidents and incidents with an unknown cause
1969 disasters in Nigeria